Cape Reinga Lighthouse is a lighthouse at Cape Reinga in the Northland Region of the North Island of New Zealand. It is owned and operated by Maritime New Zealand. The lighthouse is a common New Zealand icon and a popular tourist destination although the lighthouse itself is not open to the public.

History 

The lighthouse was built in 1941 and first lit during May of that year. It was the last manned light to be built in New Zealand and replaced the Cape Maria Van Diemen Lighthouse, located on nearby Motuopao Island, which had been built in 1879. Accessing that lighthouse was difficult due to the rough seas in the area, so in 1938, it was decided to move the lighthouse to Cape Reinga for safety reasons. The complete lantern fittings from Motuopao Island were reused at Cape Reinga, though the new lighthouse was fitted with a 1000 watt electrical lamp instead that could be seen for 26 nautical miles (48 km). The lamp was powered by a diesel generator.

In 1987, the lighthouse was fully automated and the lighthouse keepers were withdrawn.  The lighthouse is now monitored remotely from Wellington.  In May 2000 the original lens and lamp were replaced by a 50 watt beacon.  The beacon is powered by batteries that are recharged by solar cells.  The beacon flashes every 12 seconds and can be seen for 19 nautical miles (35 km).

See also 

 List of lighthouses in New Zealand

References

External links 

 
 Lighthouses of New Zealand Maritime New Zealand

Lighthouses completed in 1941
Lighthouses in New Zealand
Far North District
Transport buildings and structures in the Northland Region
Tourist attractions in the Northland Region
1940s architecture in New Zealand